Nagoa is a village in Salcette, Goa, adjacent to the village of Verna. It is located approximately 11 km north of the South Goa district headquarters Margão, 17 km south-east of Vasco da Gama and 22 km south-east of the state capital Panjim.

References

Villages in South Goa district